Henryk Gołębiewski may refer to:

 Henryk Gołębiewski (politician) (born 1942), Polish politician
 Henryk Gołębiewski (actor) (born 1956), Polish actor